William Thomas Rodgers, Baron Rodgers of Quarry Bank,  (born 28 October 1928) is a British politician who served as Secretary of State for Transport from 1976 to 1979, and was one of the 'Gang of Four' of senior British Labour Party politicians who defected to form the Social Democratic Party (SDP). He subsequently helped to lead the SDP into the merger that formed the Liberal Democrats in 1988, and later served as that party's leader in the House of Lords between 1997 and 2001.

Early life
Rodgers was born in Liverpool, Lancashire, and educated at Quarry Bank High School in Liverpool. After national service in the King's Regiment (Liverpool), he studied Modern History at Magdalen College, Oxford on an Open Exhibition. He was general secretary of the Fabian Society from 1953 to 1960 and a councillor on St Marylebone Borough Council from 1958 to 1962. He was instrumental in lobbying the National Executive Committee of the Labour Party to reverse its vote in favour of unilateral nuclear disarmament in 1961. He also unsuccessfully fought a by-election at Bristol West in 1957.

Member of Parliament
Rodgers first entered the British House of Commons at a by-election in 1962, representing Stockton-on-Tees, and served in Labour Governments under Harold Wilson and James Callaghan, becoming Secretary of State for Transport in Callaghan's Cabinet in 1976. Within the Labour Party he was known for being a highly effective organiser around centrist causes such as multilateral nuclear disarmament and Britain's membership of the European Economic Community. He held the post until Labour's defeat in the 1979 general election. From 1979 to 1981 he was Shadow Defence Secretary. With Labour drifting to the left, Rodgers joined Shirley Williams, Roy Jenkins and David Owen in forming the Social Democratic Party in 1981. In September 1982, Rodgers stood to become President of the SDP, but took only 19.4% of the vote, and a distant second place behind Williams.

Gang of Four
At the 1983 general election the SDP–Liberal Alliance won many votes but few seats, and Rodgers lost his seat of Stockton North (known as Stockton-on-Tees before the boundary changes of 1983). He remained outside Parliament, unsuccessfully contesting Milton Keynes for the SDP in the 1987 general election, until he was created a life peer as Baron Rodgers of Quarry Bank, of Kentish Town in the London Borough of Camden on 12 February 1992. During that interval he was Director-General of the Royal Institute of British Architects and also became Chairman of the Advertising Standards Authority.

In 1987, Rodgers was chairman of the successful "Yes to Unity" campaign within the SDP in favour of merger with the Liberal Party. He became the Liberal Democrats' Lords spokesman on Home Affairs in 1994 and was its leader in the Lords between 1997 and 2001. His autobiography was titled Fourth Among Equals, reflecting his position as the least prominent of the SDP's founders. Rodgers was interviewed in 2012 as part of The History of Parliament's oral history project.

Personal life
In 1955, Rodgers married Silvia Szulman (1928–2006), a Berlin-born artist and writer, who became a political hostess. The couple had three daughters, Rachel, Lucy and Juliet.

On 8 May 2001, Rodgers suffered a stroke at his home and was treated at the Royal Free Hospital and attended speech therapy sessions at North Middlesex Hospital for two and a half years. He said he was "very, very lucky not to have suffered any physical damage" as a result. He has since been a keen advocate for better treatment and care for stroke victims.

In popular culture
Rodgers was a main character in Steve Waters' 2017 play Limehouse, which premiered at the Donmar Warehouse; he was portrayed by Paul Chahidi.

References

Bibliography

External links
Lord Rodgers of Quarry Bank profile at the site of Liberal Democrats
Recent Speeches in the Lords

The Papers of Lord Rodgers of Quarry Bank held at Churchill Archives Centre

|-

|-

|-

|-

|-

|-

1928 births
20th-century British Army personnel
Alumni of Magdalen College, Oxford
British autobiographers
British Secretaries of State
Chairs of the Fabian Society
Councillors in Greater London
GMB (trade union)-sponsored MPs
General Secretaries of the Fabian Society
Labour Party (UK) MPs for English constituencies
Liberal Democrats (UK) life peers
Living people
Members of St Marylebone Metropolitan Borough Council
Members of the Privy Council of the United Kingdom
Ministers in the Wilson governments, 1964–1970
People educated at Quarry Bank High School
British political party founders
Politicians from Liverpool
Secretaries of State for Transport (UK)
Social Democratic Party (UK) MPs for English constituencies
UK MPs 1959–1964
UK MPs 1964–1966
UK MPs 1966–1970
UK MPs 1970–1974
UK MPs 1974
UK MPs 1974–1979
UK MPs 1979–1983
Life peers created by Elizabeth II